Bertha Alice Williams Graham Gifford (October 30, 1871 – August 20, 1951) was a farmwife in rural Catawissa, Missouri during the early 1900s who was accused of murdering three members of the local community and suspected in 15 additional deaths. Some consider her to be America's fourth solo female serial killer, behind Lydia Sherman, Jane Toppan, and Nannie Doss.

Personal life
Bertha Alice Williams was born in Morse Mill, Missouri, the daughter of William Poindexter Williams and his wife Matilda, née Lee. She was one of 10 children. She was married to Henry Graham and this union produced one daughter, Lila. Following Graham's death, she married Eugene Gifford and they had one child, James.

Crimes
Gifford was renowned in her community for her cooking skills and caring for sick neighbors and relatives, and five people died in her care, prompting a grand jury investigation. In 1928, Gifford was arrested at Eureka, Missouri and charged with three murders. Following the exhumation and post-mortem exams of Edward Brinley and Elmer and Lloyd Schamel, the bodies were found to contain large amounts of arsenic. Gifford was put on trial for their murders in Union, Missouri.  Following the three-day trial, she was found not guilty by reason of insanity and committed to the Missouri State Hospital #4 (a psychiatric institution) where she remained until her death in 1951.

Gifford acted the role of nurse for her sick neighbors, and a total of 17 people died in her care. It wasn't until after the grand jury investigation of the five deaths that suspicions were raised about an additional 12 deaths. Given the high mortality rates and the amateur use of arsenic for medical reasons at the time, no one can be certain that she purposefully killed everyone that had been in her care.

See also 
 List of serial killers in the United States
 List of serial killers by number of victims

References

External links
Bertha Gifford website

1871 births
1951 deaths
20th-century American criminals
American female serial killers
American people who died in prison custody
American serial killers
Criminals from Missouri
People acquitted by reason of insanity
People from Franklin County, Missouri
People from Jefferson County, Missouri
People from St. Louis County, Missouri
Poisoners
Prisoners who died in Missouri detention
Serial killers who died in prison custody